In ecology, a niche is the match of a species to a specific environmental condition. It describes how an organism or population responds to the distribution of resources and competitors (for example, by growing when resources are abundant, and when predators, parasites and pathogens are scarce) and how it in turn alters those same factors (for example, limiting access to resources by other organisms, acting as a food source for predators and a consumer of prey). "The type and number of variables comprising the dimensions of an environmental niche vary from one species to another [and] the relative importance of particular environmental variables for a species may vary according to the geographic and biotic contexts".

A Grinnellian niche is determined by the habitat in which a species lives and its accompanying behavioral adaptations. An Eltonian niche emphasizes that a species not only grows in and responds to an environment, it may also change the environment and its behavior as it grows. The Hutchinsonian niche uses mathematics and statistics to try to explain how species coexist within a given community.

The concept of ecological niche is central to ecological biogeography, which focuses on spatial patterns of ecological communities.  "Species distributions and their dynamics over time result from properties of the species, environmental variation..., and interactions between the two—in particular the abilities of some species, especially our own, to modify their environments and alter the range dynamics of many other species." Alteration of an ecological niche by its inhabitants is the topic of niche construction.

The majority of species exist in a standard ecological niche, sharing behaviors, adaptations, and functional traits similar to the other closely related species within the same broad taxonomic class, but there are exceptions. A premier example of a non-standard niche filling species is the flightless, ground-dwelling kiwi bird of New Zealand, which feeds on worms and other ground creatures, and lives its life in a mammal-like niche. Island biogeography can help explain island species and associated unfilled niches.

Grinnellian niche
The ecological meaning of niche comes from the meaning of niche as a recess in a wall for a statue, which itself is probably derived from the Middle French word nicher, meaning to nest. 
The term was coined by the naturalist Roswell Hill Johnson
but Joseph Grinnell was probably the first to use it in a research program in 1917, in his paper "The niche relationships of the California Thrasher".

The Grinnellian niche concept embodies the idea that the niche of a species is determined by the habitat in which it lives and its accompanying behavioral adaptations. In other words, the niche is the sum of the habitat requirements and behaviors that allow a species to persist and produce offspring. For example, the behavior of the California thrasher is consistent with the chaparral habitat it lives in—it breeds and feeds in the underbrush and escapes from its predators by shuffling from underbrush to underbrush. Its 'niche' is defined by the felicitous complementing of the thrasher's behavior and physical traits (camouflaging color, short wings, strong legs) with this habitat.

Grinnellian niches can be defined by non-interactive (abiotic) variables and environmental conditions on broad scales. Variables of interest in this niche class include average temperature, precipitation, solar radiation, and terrain aspect which have become increasingly accessible across spatial scales. Most literature has focused on Ginnellian niche constructs, often from a climatic perspective, to explain distribution and abundance. Current predictions on species responses to climate change strongly rely on projecting altered environmental conditions on species distributions. However, it is increasingly acknowledged that climate change also influences species interactions and an Eltonian perspective may be advantageous in explaining these processes.

This perspective of niche allows for the existence of both ecological equivalents and empty niches. An ecological equivalent to an organism is an organism from a different taxonomic group exhibiting similar adaptations in a similar habitat, an example being the different succulents found in American and African deserts, cactus and euphorbia, respectively. As another example, the anole lizards of the Greater Antilles are a rare example of convergent evolution, adaptive radiation, and the existence of ecological equivalents: the anole lizards evolved in similar microhabitats independently of each other and resulted in the same ecomorphs across all four islands.

Eltonian niche
In 1927 Charles Sutherland Elton, a British ecologist, defined a niche as follows: "The 'niche' of an animal means its place in the biotic environment, its relations to food and enemies."

Elton classified niches according to foraging activities ("food habits"):

Conceptually, the Eltonian niche introduces the idea of a species' response to and effect on the environment. Unlike other niche concepts, it emphasizes that a species not only grows in and responds to an environment based on available resources, predators, and climatic conditions, but also changes the availability and behavior of those factors as it grows. In an extreme example, beavers require certain resources in order to survive and reproduce, but also construct dams that alter water flow in the river where the beaver lives. Thus, the beaver affects the biotic and abiotic conditions of other species that live in and near the watershed. In a more subtle case, competitors that consume resources at different rates can lead to cycles in resource density that differ between species. Not only do species grow differently with respect to resource density, but their own population growth can affect resource density over time.

Eltonian niches focus on biotic interactions and consumer–resource dynamics (biotic variables) on local scales. Because of the narrow extent of focus, data sets characterizing Eltonian niches typically are in the form of detailed field studies of specific individual phenomena, as the dynamics of this class of niche are difficult to measure at a broad geographic scale. However, the Eltonian niche may be useful in the explanation of a species' endurance of global change. Because adjustments in biotic interactions inevitably change abiotic factors, Eltonian niches can be useful in describing the overall response of a species to new environments.

Hutchinsonian niche

The Hutchinsonian niche is an "n-dimensional hypervolume", where the dimensions are environmental conditions and resources, that define the requirements of an individual or a species to practice its way of life, more particularly, for its population to persist. The "hypervolume" defines the multi-dimensional space of resources (e.g., light, nutrients, structure, etc.) available to (and specifically used by) organisms, and "all species other than those under consideration are regarded as part of the coordinate system."

The niche concept was popularized by the zoologist G. Evelyn Hutchinson in 1957. Hutchinson inquired into the question of why there are so many types of organisms in any one habitat. His work inspired many others to develop models to explain how many and how similar coexisting species could be within a given community, and led to the concepts of 'niche breadth' (the variety of resources or habitats used by a given species), 'niche partitioning' (resource differentiation by coexisting species), and 'niche overlap' (overlap of resource use by different species).

Statistics were introduced into the Hutchinson niche by Robert MacArthur and Richard Levins using the 'resource-utilization' niche employing histograms to describe the 'frequency of occurrence' as a function of a Hutchinson coordinate. So, for instance, a Gaussian might describe the frequency with which a species ate prey of a certain size, giving a more detailed niche description than simply specifying some median or average prey size. For such a bell-shaped distribution, the position, width and form of the niche correspond to the mean, standard deviation and the actual distribution itself. One advantage in using statistics is illustrated in the figure, where it is clear that for the narrower distributions (top) there is no competition for prey between the extreme left and extreme right species, while for the broader distribution (bottom), niche overlap indicates competition can occur between all species. The resource-utilization approach consists in postulating that not only competition can occur, but also that it does occur, and that overlap in resource utilization directly enables the estimation of the competition coefficients. This postulate, however, can be misguided, as it ignores the impacts that the resources of each category have on the organism and the impacts that the organism has on the resources of each category. For instance, the resource in the overlap region can be non-limiting, in which case there is no competition for this resource despite niche overlap.

An organism free of interference from other species could use the full range of conditions (biotic and abiotic) and resources in which it could survive and reproduce which is called its fundamental niche. However, as a result of pressure from, and interactions with, other organisms (i.e. inter-specific competition) species are usually forced to occupy a niche that is narrower than this, and to which they are mostly highly adapted; this is termed the realized niche. Hutchinson used the idea of competition for resources as the primary mechanism driving ecology, but overemphasis upon this focus has proved to be a handicap for the niche concept. In particular, overemphasis upon a species' dependence upon resources has led to too little emphasis upon the effects of organisms on their environment, for instance, colonization and invasions.

The term "adaptive zone" was coined by the paleontologist George Gaylord Simpson to explain how a population could jump from one niche to another that suited it, jump to an 'adaptive zone', made available by virtue of some modification, or possibly a change in the food chain, that made the adaptive zone available to it without a discontinuity in its way of life because the group was 'pre-adapted' to the new ecological opportunity.

Hutchinson's "niche" (a description of the ecological space occupied by a species) is subtly different from the "niche" as defined by Grinnell (an ecological role, that may or may not be actually filled by a species—see vacant niches).

A niche is a very specific segment of ecospace occupied by a single species. On the presumption that no two species are identical in all respects (called Hardin's 'axiom of inequality') and the competitive exclusion principle, some resource or adaptive dimension will provide a niche specific to each species. Species can however share a 'mode of life' or 'autecological strategy' which are broader definitions of ecospace. For example, Australian grasslands species, though different from those of the Great Plains grasslands, exhibit similar modes of life.

Once a niche is left vacant, other organisms can fill that position. For example, the niche that was left vacant by the extinction of the tarpan has been filled by other animals (in particular a small horse breed, the konik). Also, when plants and animals are introduced into a new environment, they have the potential to occupy or invade the niche or niches of native organisms, often outcompeting the indigenous species. Introduction of non-indigenous species to non-native habitats by humans often results in biological pollution by the exotic or invasive species.

The mathematical representation of a species' fundamental niche in ecological space, and its subsequent projection back into geographic space, is the domain of niche modelling.

Contemporary niche theory
Contemporary niche theory (also called "classic niche theory" in some contexts) is a framework that was originally designed to reconcile different definitions of niches (see Grinnellian, Eltonian, and Hutchinsonian definitions above), and to help explain the underlying processes that affect Lotka-Volterra relationships within an ecosystem. The framework centers around "consumer-resource models" which largely split a given ecosystem into resources (e.g. sunlight or available water in soil) and consumers (e.g. any living thing, including plants and animals), and attempts to define the scope of possible relationships that could exist between the two groups.

In contemporary niche theory, the "impact niche" is defined as the combination of effects that a given consumer has on both a). the resources that it uses, and b). the other consumers in the ecosystem. Therefore, the impact niche is equivalent to the Eltonian niche since both concepts are defined by the impact of a given species on its environment.

The range of environmental conditions where a species can successfully survive and reproduce (i.e. the Hutchinsonian definition of a realized niche) is also encompassed under contemporary niche theory, termed the "requirement niche". The requirement niche is bounded by both the availability of resources as well as the effects of coexisting consumers (e.g. competitors and predators).

Coexistence under contemporary niche theory 
Contemporary niche theory provides three requirements that must be met in order for two species (consumers) to coexist:

 The requirement niches of both consumers must overlap.
 Each consumer must outcompete the other for the resource that it needs most. For example, if two plants (P1 and P2) are competing for nitrogen and phosphorus in a given ecosystem, they will only coexist if they are limited by different resources (P1 is limited by nitrogen and P2 is limited by phosphorus, perhaps) and each species must outcompete the other species to get that resource (P1 needs to be better at obtaining nitrogen and P2 needs to be better at obtaining phosphorus). Intuitively, this makes sense from an inverse perspective: If both consumers are limited by the same resource, one of the species will ultimately be the better competitor, and only that species will survive. Furthermore, if P1 was outcompeted for the nitrogen (the resource it needed most) it would not survive. Likewise, if P2 was outcompeted for phosphorus, it would not survive. 
 The availability of the limiting resources (nitrogen and phosphorus in the above example) in the environment are equivalent.

These requirements are interesting and controversial because they require any two species to share a certain environment (have overlapping requirement niches) but fundamentally differ the ways that they use (or "impact") that environment. These requirements have repeatedly been violated by nonnative (i.e. introduced and invasive) species, which often coexist with new species in their nonnative ranges, but do not appear to be constricted these requirements. In other words, contemporary niche theory predicts that species will be unable to invade new environments outside of their requirement (i.e. realized) niche, yet many examples of this are well-documented. Additionally, contemporary niche theory predicts that species will be unable to establish in environments where other species already consume resources in the same ways as the incoming species, however examples of this are also numerous.

Niche and Geographic Range 

The geographic range of a species can be viewed as a spatial reflection of its niche, along with characteristics of the geographic template and the species that influence its potential to colonize.  The fundamental geographic range of a species is the area it occupies in which environmental conditions are favorable, without restriction from barriers to disperse or colonize.  A species will be confined to its realized geographic range when confronting biotic interactions or abiotic barriers that limit dispersal, a more narrow subset of its larger fundamental geographic range.

An early study on ecological niches conducted by Joseph H. Connell analyzed the environmental factors that limit the range of a barnacle (Chthamalus stellatus) on Scotland's Isle of Cumbrae. In his experiments, Connell described the dominant features of C. stellatus niches and provided explanation for their distribution on intertidal zone of the rocky coast of the Isle. Connell described the upper portion of C. stellatus's range is limited by the barnacle's ability to resist dehydration during periods of low tide. The lower portion of the range was limited by interspecific interactions, namely competition with a cohabiting barnacle species and predation by a snail. By removing the competing B. balanoides, Connell showed that C. stellatus was able to extend the lower edge of its realized niche in the absence of competitive exclusion. These experiments demonstrate how biotic and abiotic factors limit the distribution of an organism.

Parameters
The different dimensions, or plot axes, of a niche represent different biotic and abiotic variables. These factors may include descriptions of the organism's life history, habitat, trophic position (place in the food chain), and geographic range. According to the competitive exclusion principle, no two species can occupy the same niche in the same environment for a long time. The parameters of a realized niche are described by the realized niche width of that species. Some plants and animals, called specialists, need specific habitats and surroundings to survive, such as the spotted owl, which lives specifically in old growth forests. Other plants and animals, called generalists, are not as particular and can survive in a range of conditions, for example the dandelion.

See also 

Ontogenetic niche shift
Marginal distribution (biology)
Fitness landscape
Niche differentiation
Overpopulation
Phylogenetic niche conservatism
Unified neutral theory of biodiversity

References

External links
Concept of ecological niche
Environmental Niche – Extinction of the Dinosaurs
Ontology of the niche
Niche restriction and segregation
Vacant niche
Latitude-niche width hypothesis

 
Biogeography
Habitat
Landscape ecology